Timothy Corrigan (born 1956/1957) is an interior designer with offices in Los Angeles and Paris. His firm, Timothy Corrigan, Inc., specializes in comfortably-elegant interior design and incorporates antiques into most of its projects. His clients include European and Middle Eastern royalty, Hollywood celebrities and corporate leaders.

Early life
Corrigan grew up in the Hancock Park neighborhood of Los Angeles, but moved with his family when he was 12. Decades later, for almost ten years he lived a mere five blocks from his childhood home. When he learned the property was on the market, he rushed over to see it, saying it "was love at second sight." He says he "sent the owner a photo of me in the swimming pool when I was a little boy, with a note that said, 'Let me come home.'"

Career
Prior to forming his design firm in 1998, Corrigan worked in advertising where he was president of international operations for Backer Speilvogel Bates Worldwide, which later became Bates Worldwide, then Saatchi & Saatchi's Bates Worldwide.

Corrigan is one of the world’s leading interior designers . With offices in Los Angeles and Paris his firm has completed projects in Europe, the Middle East and across the United States.

Corrigan has two best-selling books, published by Rizzoli: “An Invitation to Chateau du Grand-Lucé,” that chronicles the restoration of his landmark chateau in France, and his second book, “The New Elegance: Stylish, Comfortable Rooms for Today” that features 11 of Timothy’s projects around the world, and highlights the building blocks for successful decoration.

Restoration
In addition to restoring his childhood home, Corrigan has purchased and renovated several châteaux in France. He reportedly fell in love with the country the first time he traveled there in the 1980s.

In 2004, the French government sold him the Château du Grand-Lucé, located in Le Grand-Lucé within France's Loire Valley. The château and its gardens are listed as French National Landmarks, which posed additional challenges during the renovation. His 2013 book, "An Invitation to Château du Grand-Lucé", details Corrigan's against-all-odds acquisition of the 1764 manor that was in dire need of repair. His subsequent painstaking restoration and decoration brought it back to life as his private home. In 2016, Corrigan put the Château du Grand-Lucé back on the market.

In spring of 2018, he purchased the Chateau de la Chevallerie, and began the renovation process. During the Covid-19 related travel ban, Timothy has had to oversee the restoration from Los Angeles

Licensing
Corrigan designed the first fully integrated line of fabrics, trims, furniture, and floor covering for Schumacher and Patterson, Flynn & Martin, introduced in 2014. He has designed two tabletop collections for porcelain manufacturer Royal Limoges, a collection of high-end bathroom fittings and accessories for THG Paris, a wallcovering collection for London-based Fromental, and a passementerie collection for Samuel & Sons.

His latest projects include designs for luxury performance fabrics and rugs for Perennials, and hide rugs for Kyle Bunting.

Press
Corrigan has been featured in numerous, prestigious publications including The Times, The Wall Street Journal, Architectural Digest, Elle Décor, Point de Vue, The New York Times, InStyle, Traditional Home, and Town & Country. He has also appeared on national and international television, including on HGTV’s Million Dollar Rooms, HGTV’s Top Ten, LXTV’s International Open House – Paris, and Extra. He was chosen to design the Architectural Digest green room at the 59th Primetime Emmy Awards.

Awards
Corrigan has been honored by design centers around the world and named to multiple top designer lists:
 Architectural Digest AD100 (World's Top Interior Designers and Architects); one of only nine designers who were consecutively on the list since 2007 
 "Elle Decor 2020 A-List: 125 of the Best Interior Designers in The World" 
 "Elle Decor 2019 A-List" 
 "Elle Decor 2018 A-List" 
 "2017 Design Icon" Las Vegas Market
 Luxe Interiors + Design 2017 & 2019 Gold List 
 2014 "Star of Design" Award for Interior Design, Pacific Design Center in West Hollywood, CA 
 Corrigan is the only American designer honored by the French Heritage Society, for his restoration work of landmark buildings in France.
 Robb Report's Top 40 Interior Designers in the World, 2007 
 Corrigan was honored by The Institute of Classical Architecture and Art Southern California Chapter at their annual Legacy Dinner in October 2018, for his achievements and contributions in advancing the classical tradition in architecture and art.
 Named to the Departures Design Council in 2019.
 2019 1stDibs 50: From their unique approach to the craft to their ability to create one-of-a-kind spaces, these designers are leading by example in 2019. 
 September 2020, named to "Country and Town House" UK, The 50 Best Interior Designers

External links 

 Rizzoli, New York

American interior designers
Living people
Year of birth missing (living people)
1950s births